The Hollies are an English rock group.

Hollies may also refer to:

Works by The Hollies
Hollies (1965 album), an album by The Hollies
Hollies (1974 album), an album by The Hollies
The Hollies (EP), a 1964 EP by The Hollies
The Hollies: 20 Golden Greats, a 1978 compilation album

Persons with the surname
Eric Hollies (1912–1981), English cricketer

See also
 The Hollies' Greatest Hits (disambiguation)
 Holli, a singular form for "hollies"
 Holly (disambiguation), a singular form for "hollies"
 Hollie (disambiguation), a singular form for "hollies"
 Hollis (disambiguation)